Vladimir Vasilyevich Kuznetsov (2 April 1931 – 29 August 1986) was a Soviet Russian javelin thrower.

Kuznetsov competed in the Olympics three times, in 1952, 1956 and 1964, qualifying for the final on all three occasions and placing sixth in 1952. He won the silver medal at the 1954 European Championships.  Track & Field News ranked him among the world's top 10 javelin throwers 11 times in its annual rankings, with a peak ranking of No. 2 in 1961. Kuznetsov was married to the actress Tatyana Konyukhova.

References

1931 births
1986 deaths
Athletes from Saint Petersburg
Soviet male javelin throwers
Athletes (track and field) at the 1952 Summer Olympics
Athletes (track and field) at the 1956 Summer Olympics
Athletes (track and field) at the 1964 Summer Olympics
Olympic athletes of the Soviet Union
European Athletics Championships medalists